Daniel Gonzalez (born July 12, 1992) is an American professional soccer player who plays as a midfielder.

Career

College & Youth
Gonzalez played two years college soccer at Peninsula College between 2012 and 2013.

Gonzalez played with USL PDL club Kitsap Pumas in 2014.

Professional
Gonzalez signed with United Soccer League club Oklahoma City Energy on January 28, 2015.

Personal
Daniel's brother, Miguel, also plays for the Energy.

References

1992 births
Living people
American soccer players
Kitsap Pumas players
OKC Energy FC players
Association football midfielders
Soccer players from Washington (state)
USL League Two players
USL Championship players
American sportspeople of Mexican descent